Imeroherpiidae is a family of solenogaster, comprising the sole genus Imeroherpia.

Sterrofustia